St. Mary's Centenary Degree College is a Christian minority college established in 2001 by the Archdiocese of Hyderabad.  The college is affiliated to Osmania University.  The college offers courses in Bachelor of Arts  B.Com and in  Bachelor of Business Administration.

References

Universities and colleges in Telangana
2001 establishments in Andhra Pradesh
Educational institutions established in 2001